Belhus may refer to:

 Belhus, Western Australia
 Belhus, Essex

See also
 Bell House (disambiguation)